Patoptoformis rimsaitae is a species of moth of the family Cossidae. It is found in China (Sichuan, on the eastern edge of the Tibetan plateau).

The wingspan is about 24 mm. The ground color of the forewings is grey blackish with a large yellow patch in the middle of the basal area. The middle part of the wing from the base to the inner edge is yellow. The hindwings are yellow.

The species was collected in the shrubby transition between the mountain primary mixed
forest and the alpine grassland zones. Nothing is known about the early stages.

Etymology
The species is named in honor of Dr Jolanta Rimsaite, a prominent expert of general entomology.

References

Moths described in 2012
Cossinae